HMS Erebus was a First World War monitor launched on 19 June 1916 and which served in both world wars. They were named after the two bomb vessels sent to investigate the Northwest Passage as part of Franklin's lost expedition (1845–1848), in which all 129 members eventually perished.

Monitors were designed as stable gun platforms with a shallow draught to allow operations close inshore in support of land operations, and were not intended to contest naval battles.

The Erebus class were designed to outrange German heavy shore batteries and they were also fitted with highly effective anti-torpedo bulges on each side of the hull.

Background
During the First World War, the Royal Navy developed several classes of ships which were designed to give close support to troops ashore through the use of naval bombardment. Termed monitors, they owed little to the monitors of the 19th century, though they shared the characteristics of poor seaworthiness, shallow draught and heavy armament in turrets. The size of the various monitor classes of the Royal Navy and their armaments varied greatly. The  was the United Kingdom's first attempt at a monitor carrying  guns. Following construction of the first two of the Marshall Ney-class, another four were ordered in May 1915, with the Harland and Wolff shipyard at Govan receiving a contract to construct two hulls, which were given yard numbers 492 and 493. However, all four were cancelled in June when it was realised that there were insufficient gun turrets to complete both the battleship, and the monitors before 1917.

By August 1915, the first of her class, had revealed a very poor performance in her sea trials. The monitor's engines would not start reliably and were prone to stalling, making it impossible for the ship to achieve even the minimum standard for the trial of four hours of continuous sailing at full power. The vessel was also difficult to steer. Disappointed by the failure, the Admiralty began the design of a replacement class on 6 September, which incorporated lessons learned from all of the previous classes of monitor commissioned during the war. Another significant change was to raise the top of the anti-torpedo bulge above the waterline and reduce its width; both changes would improve the stability and maneuverability of the ship at sea. The bulge was fitted along each side of the ship and was intended to absorb the impact of any explosions. To maintain protection while reducing the bulge's width, its inner compartment was made water tight and filled with 70 steel tubes, rather than leaving the inner compartment open to the sea as in previous designs.

Design and construction
It would have  loaded displacement, with a maximum operational speed of  produced by triple-expansion steam engines with two shafts, and a crew of 204. Power would be provided by four Babcock & Wilcox water-tube boilers, which would generate a combined .

Erebus was laid down at Harland and Wolff's shipyard in Govan on 12 October 1915 and launched on 19 June 1916.

The ship's main armament consisted of two BL 15in Mk I naval guns in a single forward turret. Erebus's turret was originally a spare for the battlecruiser , which was prepared in case the new BL 18in Mk I naval guns intended for the larger vessel were ineffective. Learning from the earlier experience with Ney, the turrets were adjusted to increase elevation to 30 degrees, which would add greater firing range.

Erebus was completed and commissioned on 2 September.

Service history

First World War
During the First World War, Erebus bombarded German naval forces based at the Belgian ports of Ostend and Zeebrugge.

Inter-war period
In 1919, Erebus took part in the British Invasion of Russia providing gunfire support in the White Sea and in the Baltic Sea.

In 1921, she took part in gunnery trials against the surrendered German battleship . She then served as a gunnery training ship between the two world wars. After a refit completed in August 1939, she was earmarked as guardship at Cape Town, but due to the outbreak of World War II this did not occur.

Second World War
In the early war years, Erebus served with the Eastern Fleet and the Mediterranean Fleet, where she was used to run supplies to besieged Tobruk and bombard enemy concentrations. She was present at Trincomalee during the Japanese attack on the harbour there, receiving a near-miss hit from Japanese aircraft, suffering casualties. In 1943, she was damaged while bombarding Sicily during the Allied invasion of Sicily.

Erebus was used for coastal bombardment during the Normandy Landings on 6 June 1944, firing at the batteries at Barfleur and La Pernelle. She suffered one 15-inch gun destroyed due to a premature explosion of a high explosive round in the bore.

On 10 August 1944, she was used against the defenders of the harbour at Le Havre. She was damaged by the battery at Clos des Ronces and was out of action for some time. In November 1944, she supported Operation Infatuate, the amphibious assault on Walcheren, Netherlands.

She was scrapped in July 1946. It is believed that one of Erebus 15-inch guns was used to equip , the Royal Navy's last battleship.

Footnotes

References

Bibliography

External links

Uboat.net - HMS Erebus
Personal experiences
Royal Navy history

 

Allied intervention in the Russian Civil War
Erebus-class monitors
Naval ships of Operation Neptune
Ships built by Harland and Wolff
Ships built in Govan
1916 ships
World War I monitors of the United Kingdom
World War II monitors of the United Kingdom